Sudhir Ranjan Khastgir (24 September 1907 – 6 June 1974) was an Indian painter of Bengal school of art and an art educator. A pupil of Abanindranath Tagore and Nandalal Bose, Sudhir was known for "Indian style" of painting. He graduated from Visva-Bharati University at Santiniketan in 1929. He was influenced by the Tagore family and his classic works include paintings of scenes from Indian mythologies, women, and village life. He was also the first Art teacher at The Doon School, Dehradun, when it opened in 1935. Today, the many statues and murals on display at Doon, and frescoes of dancers at the entrance of a local cinema hall, 'The Orient', are a product of his creation.

Life and career

Sudhir was born in Chittagong, Bangladesh in 1907. He soon moved to Kolkata, India for his schooling. After graduating from the Visva-Bharati University at Santiniketan, he went to Academy of Fine Arts, Munich to study Fine Arts on a scholarship. After returning from Munich, he became the first Arts master at the newly opened The Doon School. He remained in Doon for the next 20 years. During this period, he also directed some dance-dramas based on the works of Rabindranath Tagore.

While at Doon, he achieved considerable national fame and was invited by the Uttar Pradesh Government to head Lucknow College of Arts and Crafts, Lucknow (University of Lucknow) in 1956.

He was awarded the Padma Shri award by Government of India in 1957, for his significant contributions to Indian art.

Family
His elder brother, Satish Ranjan Khastgir, was a noted physicist. His daughter Shyamoli Khastgir, an environmental activist, once married to architect, Lee Tan (son of Chinese scholar of Santiniketan Tan Yun-Shan) lives in Purba Palli, Shantiniketan.

References
Notes

Bibliography
Sudhir Ranjan Khastgir by S.R. Khastgir, Gallerie 88, 2008
Myself by Sudhir Khastgir, 1955
Sudhir Ranjan by Khastgir, Lalit Kala Academi 1978.

External links

Artist profile

Recipients of the Padma Shri in arts
1907 births
1974 deaths
The Doon School faculty
Visva-Bharati University alumni
Indian art educators
Academy of Fine Arts, Munich alumni
Academic staff of the University of Lucknow
20th-century Indian painters
Artists from Kolkata
Painters from West Bengal